Ilguva Manor (pol. Dwór w Iłgowie) is a former residential manor in Ilguva village, Šakiai district, in Lithuania.

References

Manor houses in Lithuania
Classicism architecture in Lithuania